Daita Sriramulu Hindu College of Law or D.S.R. Hindu Law College is a private law school situated beside Kenedy Road, Batchupeta in Machilipatnam, Krishna district in the Indian state of Andhra Pradesh. The law school offers 3 years LL.B. courses approved by the Bar Council of India (BCI), New Delhi and affiliated to Acharya Nagarjuna University.

History
Daita Sriramulu Hindu College of Law was established in 1986 by The Hindu High and Branch School Society under the guidance of educationist Late Daita Madhusudana Sastry.

References

Law schools in Andhra Pradesh
Universities and colleges in Andhra Pradesh
Educational institutions established in 1986
1986 establishments in Andhra Pradesh